Majhupur is a village located in Kannauj district in the Indian state of Uttar Pradesh. The village was founded by Manju Singh Sikarwar.

There is a temple named Thakur Ji Maharaj Mandir which is well-known locally.

Cities and towns in Kannauj district